Paulius Jurkus  (1916–2004) was a Lithuanian painter.

See also
List of Lithuanian painters

References
Universal Lithuanian Encyclopedia

1916 births
2004 deaths
20th-century Lithuanian painters